Royal Ordnance Corps is a main corps in the Malaysian Army branch.

References

External links 
 

Malaysia Army corps and regiments